Blankenstein (Saale) station is a railway station in the municipality of Blankenstein, located in the Saale-Orla-Kreis district in Thuringia, Germany.

References

Railway stations in Thuringia
Buildings and structures in Saale-Orla-Kreis